Empire Commerce was a  tanker that was built in 1942 by Sir J Laing & Sons Ltd, Sunderland for the Ministry of War Transport(MoWT).

Description
The ship was built by Sir J Laing & Sons Ltd, Sunderland. She was launched on 29 December 1942 and completed in March 1943.

She had a GRT of 3,722 and a NRT of 1,993.

The ship was propelled by a 2-stroke Single Cycle Single Acting diesel engine, which had eight cylinders of  diameter by  stroke. The engine was built by William Doxford & Sons Ltd, Sunderland.

History
Empire Commerce was built for the MoWT. She was placed under the management of Hadley Steamship Co Ltd. Her port of registry was Sunderland. The United Kingdom Official Number 169112 and Code Letters BFJF were allocated.

Empire Commerce was a member of a number of convoys during the Second World War.

MKS15
Convoy MKS 15 departed Bizerta, Algeria on 17 June 1943 and arrived at Liverpool on 4 July. It travelled via Gibraltar (departed 23 June). The convoy joined up with Convoy SL 131 at sea on 24 June. Empire Commerce joined the convoy at Bône, Algeria and left it at Oran, Algeria.

MKS19
Convoy MKS 19 departed Tripoli, Libya on 21 July 1943 and arrived at Gibraltar on 28 July. It travelled via Algiers (departed 24 July) and Bizerta, Algeria (departed 26 July). Empire Commerce joined the convoy at Philippeville, Algeria and left it at Algiers.

MKS 26
Convoy MKS 26 departed Alexandria, Egypt on 24 September 1943 and arrived at Liverpool on 17 October. It travelled via Algiers (departed 1 October) and Gibraltar (departed 4 October). The convoy joined with Convoy SL 137 at sea on 4 October. Empire Commerce joined the convoy from Bône, Algeria, bound for Algiers. She was in ballast. Empire Commerce was north west of Philippeville at the time. The ship broke in two, with the stern section sinking. It was towed to Algiers but had been gutted by fire.

References

1942 ships
Ships built on the River Wear
Ministry of War Transport ships
Empire ships
Steamships of the United Kingdom
Maritime incidents in October 1943
World War II shipwrecks in the Mediterranean Sea
Ships sunk by German submarines in World War II